The Samsung Galaxy Xcover (GT-S5690) is a water and dust proof IP67 rated smartphone manufactured by Samsung that runs the Android operating system. It was announced and released by Samsung in August 2011. The Galaxy Xcover is succeeded by the Xcover 2. 

The Galaxy Xcover 3G smartphone, with quad band GSM. It sports a display of a 3.65 inch LCD capacitive touchscreen with 16M colours (320x480) resolution. It has a 3.15-megapixel camera with LED flash. It comes with a 1500 mAh hotswappable Li-Ion battery.

The Galaxy Xcover comes with Android 2.3.6 Gingerbread.

See also
 List of Android devices
 Samsung Galaxy
 Samsung Rugby Smart

References

Android (operating system) devices
Mobile phones introduced in 2011
Samsung mobile phones
Samsung Galaxy
Mobile phones with user-replaceable battery